Targeted killings, targeted prevention, or assassination, has been repeatedly carried out by the Israel Defense Forces (IDF) over the course of the Israeli–Palestinian conflict against militants. Nils Meltzer writes that "The term 'targeted killing' denotes the use of lethal force attributable to a subject of international law with the intent, premeditation and deliberation to kill individually selected persons not in the physical custody of those targeting them".

The Israeli army maintains that it pursues such military operations to prevent imminent attacks when it has no discernible means of making an arrest or foiling such attacks by other methods. On 14 December 2006, the Supreme Court of Israel ruled that targeted killing is a legitimate form of self-defense against terrorists, and outlined several conditions for its use. The practice of targeted killing developed in the post-World War II period, throughout which Israel has exercised the option more than any other Western democracy, according to Israeli investigative journalist Ronen Bergman.

Israel first publicly acknowledged its use of the tactic at Beit Sahour near Bethlehem in November 2000, when four laser-guided missiles from an Apache helicopter were used to kill a Tanzim leader, Hussein Abayat, in his Mitsubishi pickup truck, with collateral damage killing two 50 year-old housewives waiting for a taxi nearby, and wounding six other Palestinians in the vicinity. Israeli intelligence had turned a neighbor, Mohamamad Deifallah, while he was detained in Ramallah prison, into providing them evidence on local movements, for $250 a week, and one such tip gave them the details and coordinates for this assassination. The public admission was due to the fact an attack helicopter had been used, which meant the execution could not be denied, something that remains possible when assassinations of targets by snipers takes place.

Strike methods and well known targeted killings

Strike methods

Many strikes have been carried out by Israeli Air Force attack helicopters (mainly the AH-64 Apache) that fire guided missiles toward the target, after Shin Bet supplies intelligence for the target. Sometimes, when heavier bombs are needed, the strike is carried out by F-16 warplanes. Other strategies employ strike teams of Israeli intelligence or military operatives. These operatives infiltrate areas known to harbor targeted individuals, and eliminate their assigned targets with small arms fire or use of explosives. Snipers have also been utilized, as was in the case of Dr. Thabet Thabet in 2001.

Unmanned combat aerial vehicles have also been used for strikes.

Targeted killings
At the outset of the Second Intifada, it was reported that Ariel Sharon obtained an understanding from the administration of George W. Bush that the American government would provide support for Israel while it undertook an extensive campaign of targeted assassinations against Palestinians, in exchange for an Israeli undertaking to desist from continuing with the creation of further Israeli settlements in the occupied West Bank. Notable targeted killings by the Israeli military were Hamas leaders Mahmoud Adani (February 2001), Jamil Jadallah (October 2001), Mahmoud Abu Hanoud (November 2001), Salah Shahade (July 2002), Ibrahim al-Makadmeh (March 2003), Ismail Abu Shanab (August 2003), Ahmed Yassin (March 2004), Abdel Aziz al-Rantissi (April 2004) and Adnan al-Ghoul (October 2004), all targeted during the Second Intifada.

While the term "targeted killing" usually describes airborne attacks, Israeli security forces have killed top Palestinian militants in the past by other means, although this has never been confirmed officially. Some of the known operations include:
 Operation Wrath of God against Black September Organization and Palestinian Liberation Organization personnel alleged to have been directly or indirectly involved in the 1972 Munich massacre, led to the Lillehammer affair.
 Operation Spring of Youth against top Palestine Liberation Organisation leaders in Beirut, 1973: Muhammad Najjar, Kamal Adwan, and Kamal Nasser.
 Wadie Haddad, PFLP-EO leader who was responsible for the Entebbe hijacking. Mossad is suspected of killing him in 1978 by poisoning his toothpaste.
 Yahya El Mashad, Egyptian nuclear scientist heading Iraq's nuclear program, killed in a Paris hotel room in 1980.
 Khalil al-Wazir known by his nom de guerre Abu Jihad. One of the founders and Military Head of Fatah, killed in Tunis, 1988.
 Gerald Bull, Canadian engineer working in the development of a "supergun" for the Iraqi government. Shot dead in Brussels on 22 March 1990. Mossad is suspected.
 Abbas al-Musawi, Secretary General of Hezbollah, killed when Israeli Apache helicopters fired missiles at his motorcade in southern Lebanon on 16 February 1992. His wife, his five-year-old son, and four others were also killed.
 Emad Akel, Hamas commander, killed by Israeli soldiers in disguise near a house in Shuja'iyya, 1993.
 Fathi Shaqaqi, Secretary-General of the Palestinian Islamic Jihad, killed by a Mossad team in front of a Maltese hotel on 26 October 1995.
 Yahya Ayyash (Hamas bombmaker, "the Engineer") in Beit Lahya, Gaza, 1996. Ayyash was killed by a cell phone allegedly containing "50 grams of high-grade explosives."
 Khaled Mashal (Hamas) in Jordan, 1997 (failed)
 Abu Ali Mustafa, secretary-general of the Popular Front for the Liberation of Palestine, killed by an Israeli helicopter missile strike at his office in the West Bank town of Ramallah on 27 August 2001.
 Salah Mustafa Muhammad Shehade killed by a one-ton bomb during July 2002 in Gaza. Also killed were 11 civilians, including Shehadeh's wife and three sons, and four other children.
 Ahmed Ismail Yassin killed along with 7 other bystanders on Friday morning, 22 March 2004, when an AH-64 Apache helicopter fired Hellfire missiles as he exited a mosque in the Sabra neighborhood of Gaza.
 Naif Abu-Sharah, local commander of the al-Aqsa Martyrs' Brigades in Nablus, killed with other two senior militants during an Israeli raid in the West Bank on 27 June 2004.
 Jamal Abu Samhadana killed with three other militants on 8 June 2006, when an Israeli Apache helicopter fired four missiles at a PRC camp in Rafah.
 Possible targeted killing: Imad Mugniyah, a senior Hezbollah commander, was killed in February 2008 in a car bomb. Mossad is alleged to have been behind the killing.
 Muhammad Suleiman, Syrian general, killed on 1 August 2008 by an Israeli Navy special forces unit on a beach near Tartus.
 Nizar Rayan, Hamas leader, killed with fifteen of his relatives by an Israeli airstrike on 1 January 2009 when a 2,000-pound bomb was dropped on his house.
 Iranian scientists working for their country's nuclear program:        Masoud Alimohammadi, Majid Shahriari and Fereydoon Abbasi in 2010; Darioush Rezaeinejad in 2011; Mostafa Ahmadi Roshan in 2012.
 Possible targeted killing: Mahmoud al-Mabhouh, a senior Hamas commander and one of the founders of the al-Qassam Brigades, was killed in January 2010 by being electrocuted and/or drugged with succinylcholine, a quick-acting paralytic, and then suffocated in his room in a five-star Dubai hotel; the Dubai police said that Mossad was behind the killing.
 Zuhir al-Qaisi, secretary-general of the Popular Resistance Committees, killed with another senior militant in a missile strike by IDF aircraft on 9 March 2012 while he was driving his vehicle in western Gaza city.
 Ahmed Jabari, senior Hamas leader, killed by an Israeli drone strike on 14 November 2012 while he was traveling with his bodyguard along Omar Mukhtar Street in Gaza City.
 Raed al Atar, Hamas military commander killed with two other top Hamas commanders by an Israeli airstrike in Rafah on 21 August 2014.
 Jihad Mughniyah, Hezbollah commander killed on 18 January 2015 by an Israeli helicopter strike in Quneitra Governorate in the Syrian-controlled Golan Heights along with five other prominent members of Hezbollah and six IRGC commanders, including a general.
 Samir Kuntar killed with other seven Syrian nationals on 20 December 2015 by an Israeli airstrike in Jaramana, Syria.
 Mohamed Zouari, designer of drones for Hamas, shot to death in Sfax, Tunisia, on 15 December 2016. Mossad is suspected.
Fadi Mohammad al-Batsh, Palestinian engineer working for Hamas, shot death in Kuala Lumpur, Malaysia, on 21 April 2018. Mossad is suspected.
 Aziz Asbar, senior Syrian scientist responsible for long-range rockets and chemical weapons programs, killed in a car bomb in Masyaf, Syria, on 5 August 2018. Mossad is suspected.
Hamed Ahmed Abed Khudri, Hamas member killed on 5 May 2019 by an airstrike while travelling in a car down a street in Gaza during the day.
Baha Abu al-Ata, Islamic Jihad leader in Gaza, was killed by an Israeli airstrike on 12 November 2019.
Abdullah Ahmed Abdullah, senior al-Qaeda member, killed in Tehran on 7 August 2020 by Israeli agents at the request of the United States.
Mohsen Fakhrizadeh, Iranian nuclear scientist, killed by gunshots in Absard on 27 November 2020. Israel is suspected.
Mohammed Abdullah Fayyad, Hamas commander, killed by an Israeli airstrike in Gaza at the start of Operation Guardian of the Walls on 10 May 2021.
Bassem Issa, Hamas security council member, was killed by an airstrike in Gaza on 12 May 2021.
Tayseer Jabari, Islamic Jihad leader in Gaza, was killed in an airstrike on 5 August 2022.

Civilian casualty ratio
The Yamam branch of the Israel Border Police has on occasion shot innocent Palestinians due to a mistaken identity, as in the case of the shepherd Abd al-Rahman Jabarah, a passenger in a car, who was shot in the head at point-blank range,  after being confused with  his  brother, A’amar, a suspected car thief,  or the execution of Ahmad ‘Abdu on 25 May 2021 as he got into his car, apparently because he was mistaken for his uncle  Mohammed Abu Arab, whom the police wanted to take in for questioning. 

According to the Israeli Human Rights organization B'Tselem, which uses data independent of the Israeli military, Israeli targeted killings claimed 425 Palestinian lives between September 2000 and August 2011. Of these, 251 persons (59.1 percent) were the targeted individuals and 174 (40.9 percent) were civilian bystanders. This implies a ratio of civilians to targets of 1:1.44 during the whole period.

The civilian casualty ratio of the targeted killings was surveyed by Haaretz military journalist Amos Harel. In 2002 and 2003, the ratio was 1:1, meaning one civilian killed for every target killed. Harel called this period "the dark days" because of the relatively high civilian death toll as compared to later years. He attributed this to an Israeli Air Force (IAF) practice of attacking targets even when they were located in densely populated areas. While there were always safety rules, argued Harel, these were "bent" at times in view of the target's importance.

According to Harel, the civilian casualty ratio dropped steeply to 1:28 in late 2005, meaning one civilian killed for every 28 targets killed. Harel credited this drop to the new IAF chief Eliezer Shkedi's policies. The ratio rose again in 2006 to 1:10, a fact that Harel blamed on "several IAF mishaps". However, in 2007 and 2008 the ratio dropped to a level of less than 1:30, or 2–3 percent of the total casualties being civilian. Figures showing an improvement from 1:1 in 2002 to 1:30 in 2008 were also cited by Jerusalem Post journalist Yaakov Katz. Professor Alan Dershowitz of Harvard Law School stated that the 2008 figure of 1:30 represents the lowest civilian to combatant casualty ratio in history in the setting of combating terrorism. Dershowitz criticized the international media and human rights organizations for not taking sufficient note of it. He also argued that even this figure may be misleading because not all civilians are innocent bystanders.

In October 2009, Dershowitz stated that the ratio for Israel's campaign of targeted killings of terrorists stood at 1 civilian for every 28 targets. He argued that "this is the best ratio of any country in the world that is fighting asymmetrical warfare against terrorists who hide behind civilians. It is far better than the ratio achieved by Great Britain and the United States in Iraq or Afghanistan, where both nations employ targeted killings of terrorist leaders." Regarding the practices which might have led to this record and the reasons the civilian death rate nevertheless remained above zero, Dershowitz cited Col. Richard Kemp's statements on the Gaza War:

[f]rom my knowledge of the IDF and from the extent to which I have been following the current operation, I don't think there has ever been a time in the history of warfare when any army has made more efforts to reduce civilian casualties and deaths of innocent people than the IDF is doing today in Gaza... Hamas, the enemy they have been fighting, has been trained extensively by Iran and by Hezbollah, to fight among the people, to use the civilian population in Gaza as a human shield... Hamas factor in the uses of the population as a major part of their defensive plan. So even though as I say, Israel, the IDF, has taken enormous steps...to reduce civilian casualties, it is impossible, it is impossible to stop that happening when the enemy has been using civilians as human shields.

However, in a July 2011 article published in the Michigan War Studies Review, "Targeted Killings: A Modern Strategy of the State", A.E. Stahl and William F. Owen wrote that casualty ratios and death counts in general should be considered skeptically.  Stahl and Owen state: "A caveat: reported death counts and casualty ratios should be approached with skepticism. Statistics are too easy to manipulate for political purposes, vitiating arguments based on them."

Controversies relating to the strategy of targeted killings
The exact nature of the proof required by the Israelis for the killings is classified, as it involves clandestine military intelligence-oriented means and operational decisions. However all Mossad targeted killings must have the approval of the Prime Minister. Rather than being a part of a published justice system executed by lawyers and judges. International law provides two distinct normative paradigms which govern targeted killings in situations of law enforcement and the conduct of hostilities. As a form of individualized or surgical warfare, the method of targeted killing requires a "microscopic" interpretation of the law regulating the conduct of hostilities which leads nuanced results reflecting the fundamental principles underlying international humanitarian law. Any targeted killing not directed against a legitimate military target remains subject to the law enforcement paradigm, which imposes extensive restraints on the practice and even under the paradigm of hostilities, no person can be lawfully liquidated without further considerations.

Proponents of targeted killings

Proponents of the strategy argue that targeted killings are within the rules of war. They contend they are a measured response to terrorism, that focuses on actual perpetrators of militant attacks, while largely avoiding innocent casualties. They point out that targeted killings prevented some attacks against Israeli targets, weakened the effectiveness of militant groups, kept potential bomb makers on the run, and served as deterrence against militant operations. They also argue that targeted killings are less harmful toward Palestinian non-combatants than full-scale military incursion into Palestinian cities.
The IDF claims that targeted killings are only pursued to prevent future terrorist acts, not as revenge for past activities as such they are not extrajudicial. The IDF also claims that this practice is only used when there is absolutely no practical way of foiling the future acts by other means (e.g., arrest) with minimal risk to its soldiers or civilians. The IDF also claims that the practice is only used when there is a certainty in the identification of the target, in order to minimize harm to innocent bystanders. They argue that because many of the Palestinians who have targeted Israel over the years have enjoyed the protection of Arab governments, extraditing them for trial in Israel has often proved impossible. They argue that Israeli governments have long used targeted killings as a last resort, when there were no peaceful options for bringing suspected terrorists to account. In a 2010 article in Infinity Journal, it was argued that targeted killings are a strategy that entails "limited, force in support of policy" and that the strategy has proven to work, albeit within specific contexts. The context of the Infinity Journal article related specifically to Hamas' calls for ceasefires and "calms" in 2004 after the majority of their leadership had been successfully targeted by Israeli forces. According to the article, "Targeted Killings Work", Israeli targeted killings throughout "the 2000–2005 armed rebellion represented a successful strategy" because "the tactics never undermined Israeli policy enough to alter Israel's overall political objectives" and because Hamas' will to continue with armed violence was temporarily broken.

Opponents of targeted killings
Opponents of Israel's policy of targeted killings claim that it violates the laws of war. They argue that these targeted killings are extrajudicial, which violates the norms and values of a democratic society.

Some question whether the IDF claims of no other way is correct and debate the secret process of IDF deliberations. Moreover, many feel that actual injury and death of innocent bystanders, unintended as they may be, makes a strong claim against targeted killings. Some hold that such strikes do not reduce terrorism, but encourage more recruits to join militant factions, and are a setback to the Middle East peace process.

In 2003, 27 Israeli Air Force pilots composed a letter of protest to the Air Force commander Dan Halutz, announcing their refusal to continue and perform attacks on targets within Palestinian population centers, and claiming that the occupation of the Palestinians "morally corrupts the fabric of Israeli society". After more than 30 signed, 4 later recanted. One, an El Al pilot, was threaten with dismissal and another lost his civilian job.

Rule of law

In 2006, Israel's Supreme Court rejected a petition to declare targeted killings illegal. The court recognized that some killings violated international law, but the legality of individual operations must be assessed on a "case by case basis". It also said its decision that caution was needed to prevent civilian casualties. "Innocent civilians should not be targeted," it said. "Intelligence on the (targeted) person's identity must be carefully verified." The court also allowed for the possibility of compensation claims from civilians.

Defenders of this practice argue that the Palestinian National Authority has not lived up to its treaty agreements to crack down on militants and has even aided them in escaping Israeli authorities.  As such in a legal opinion, Israeli attorney general Elyakim Rubinstein wrote:
"The laws of combat which are part of international law, permit injuring, during a period of warlike operations, someone who has been positively identified as a person who is working to carry out fatal attacks against Israeli targets, those people are enemies who are fighting against Israel, with all that implies, while committing fatal terror attacks and intending to commit additional attacks—all without any countermeasures by the PA."

Gal Luft of the Institute for the Analysis of Global Security has argued that because the Palestinian National Authority is not a state, and because few governments recognize Hamas' control in Gaza, the Israeli-Palestinian conflict is not bound by the set of norms, rules, and treaties regulating other state conflicts. John Podhoretz has written for the New York Post that if the conflict were between states, targeted killing would be in accordance with the Fourth Geneva Convention (Part 3, Article 1, Section 28) which reads: "The presence of a protected person may not be used to render certain points or areas immune from military operations." Podhoretz therefore argues that international law explicitly gives Israel the right to conduct military operations against military targets under these circumstances.

Opponents of Israeli targeted killings, among them human rights groups and members of the international community including Britain, the European Union, Russia, France, India, China, Brazil, South Africa and all Arab States, have stated that targeted killings violate international laws and create an obstruction to the peace process.

Authors Howard Friel, Richard Falk, and Palestinian representatives to the United Nations Security Council regard targeted killings as extrajudicial killing, and argue that it is a rejection of the rule of law and due process. They defend that in international law assassination was outlawed in both the 1937 convention of for the Prevention and Repression of Terrorism and the 1973 New York convention.

Israeli public support or opposition towards targeted hits
Targeted killings are largely supported by Israeli society.
A poll published by Maariv newspaper in July 2001 found that 90 percent of Israeli public support the practice.

Effectiveness of Palestinian attacks and the Israeli response

Damage caused by Palestinian attacks
Palestinian attacks against Israel have been costly for Israel. IDF reports show that from the start of the Second Intifada (in 2000) to the year 2005, Palestinians killed 1,074 Israelis and wounded 7,520. Such losses generated immense public pressure from the Israeli public for a forceful response, and the Israeli increase in targeted killings was one such outcome.

Statistics on hit policy effectiveness in reducing attacks

While it is said that the IDF's reprisal targeted killing policy has reduced the effectiveness of Palestinian attacks, it increased the number of Hamas attacks between 2001 and 2005. Although the total number of Hamas operations increased, deaths resulting from such attacks plunged from a high of 75 in 2001, to 21 in 2005. For example, after the targeting of Yassin in 2004 there was a severe increase in the number of attacks carried out (an increase of 299 attacks) yet there were only 4 suicide attacks, a decrease from the previous year. According to the report by A.E. Stahl, a Research Fellow at the International Institute for Counter-Terrorism, following the targeted operation against Yassin, "Suicide terrorism by Hamas decreased by five and the total number of deaths caused by suicidal terrorism also declined by 19.  Though the total number of attacks increased the total number of deaths decreased severely: attacks rose by  299 but deaths fell by 27."

Targeted killings may also have been effective, as is witnessed in the political reactions of Hamas. Stipulations were demanded by Hamas in the form of Tahadiyehs and Hudnas. It seems Hamas was "forced to operate at reduced levels of efficiency" and was eventually forced to agree to a Tahadiyeh, likely due to targeted killings.

See also 
 Folke Bernadotte, Swedish diplomat killed by the Zionist group Lehi in 1948
 Anat Kamm-Uri Blau affair
 Counter-terrorism
 Extrajudicial execution
 List of Israeli assassinations
 Manhunt (military)
 Operation Damocles
 Targeted killing
 Targeted Killing in International Law
 Targeted Killings: Law and Morality in an Asymmetrical World
 Rise and Kill First: The Secret History of Israel's Targeted Assassinations
 List of Mossad operations

Notes

Citations

Sources

External links 
 Israel's assassinations raise questions. Jillian Kestler-DAmours, Al Jazeera, 18 November 2012
 Extra-Judicial Executions as Israeli Government Policy (1 August 2006– 30 June 2008). Palestinian Centre for Human Rights, August 2008
 PCHR Assassination Reports. Retrieved 19 September 2013

Military operations of the Israeli–Palestinian conflict
Extrajudicial killings
Targeted killing